Abram William Lauder (June 6, 1834 – February 20, 1884) was a Canadian lawyer and political figure. He represented Grey South in the Legislative Assembly of Ontario from 1867 to 1874 and Grey East from 1875 to 1884.

Biography
Lauder was born at Bewcastle in England in 1834, studied in Scotland and later came to Canada West. He taught school for a while, then moved to Toronto, articled in law and was called to the bar in 1864.

In 1856, he and writer Maria Elise Turner Lauder were married. They had one child, the pianist William Waugh Lauder.

In 1871, it was found that one of Lauder's supporters had used bribery to obtain votes. Lauder himself was not implicated, but was unseated as a result and then was reelected in the by-election that followed. Lauder later proved that a government land valuator, John L. Lewis had influenced voters in Proton by promising benefits from a Liberal government; also implicated were Archibald McKellar, Adam Oliver and James Kirkpatrick Kerr, the law partner of Ontario Premier Edward Blake. In 1872, Lauder defended the strike committee of the Toronto Typographical Union against charges brought forward by the Master Printers' Association; Canadian law at the time was not clear on the status of labour organizations.

In 1881, Lauder Township was named in his honor. He died in Toronto in 1884.

References

External links 
Biography at the Dictionary of Canadian Biography Online

1834 births
1884 deaths
Progressive Conservative Party of Ontario MPPs
Canadian Methodists
English emigrants to pre-Confederation Ontario
Immigrants to the Province of Canada